Michael Stern (born June 13, 1979) is an American real estate developer.

Early life
Stern was born on June 13, 1979 to a Jewish family and raised in Five Towns on Long Island. He is a graduate of Lawrence High School.

Career
After school, he took a job as a project manager for a developer in Florida and after three years - with funding from friends and family - he began to build spec homes on the side. This eventually evolved into the building of townhouses, mid-rises and high-rises. In the early 2000s, he returned to New York, where he built low-rise houses in the four boroughs.

In a joint venture with Kevin P. Maloney's Property Markets Group, JDS completed the conversion of the Walker Tower at 212 West 18th Street in Chelsea into condominiums and is building the 1,428 foot 111 West 57th Street in Manhattan with non-union labor, unprecedented for large-scale construction in Manhattan. JDS is also developing the American Copper Buildings (originally known as 626 First Avenue), a dual-tower residential skyscraper under construction in the Kips Bay neighborhood of New York City, in Manhattan and the 1,066 foot 9 DeKalb Avenue in Brooklyn, which would become the tallest structure in New York City outside Manhattan.

He was named to the 40 Under 40: Class of 2015 by Crain's New York.

Personal life
Stern is divorced and has two children.

References

American real estate businesspeople
20th-century American Jews
1979 births
Living people
21st-century American Jews